Robert Horatio Walpole, 10th Baron Walpole of Walpole, 8th Baron Walpole of Wolterton,  (8 December 1938 – 8 May 2021), was a British politician who, as an excepted hereditary peer, was a member of the House of Lords until his retirement in 2017.

Ancestors
Walpole was a relative of Sir Robert Walpole, the first British Prime Minister. He was the 10th and 8th Baron Walpole (from two different creations). His ancestors include Sir Robert Walpole's father Robert Walpole (1650–1700).

Education and local government career
He was educated at Eton and King's College, Cambridge, where he received a BA and an MA He served on the County Council of Norfolk for eleven years from 1970 to 1981.

House of Lords career
He entered the House on the death of his father in 1989. He was a crossbencher and was internally elected to continue serving after the House of Lords Act 1999 prevented most hereditary peers from sitting. He retired from Parliament on 13 June 2017.

Family
His heir was Jonathan Robert Hugh Walpole (born 16 November 1967), a writer; he had four other children including Alice Walpole, a diplomat, by his first wife Judith Walpole (née Schofield), later Judith Chaplin. Their marriage was dissolved in 1979. In 1980 Walpole married Laurel Celia Ball with whom he has three further children.

Wealth and estates

His father's net estate at his death in February 1989 was sworn as £2,065,295. In April 2016 he sold Wolterton Hall, the house commissioned by his ancestor the 1st Baron Walpole in 1742, where he and his father had lived. He lived nearby at Mannington Hall, a house owned by his family since the 18th century.

Death
Walpole died on 8 May 2021, aged 82. The title was inherited by his eldest son, Jonathan Robert Hugh Walpole, who became the 11th Baron Walpole.

References

1938 births
2021 deaths
Barons in the Peerage of Great Britain
People educated at Eton College
Alumni of King's College, Cambridge
Robert
Crossbench hereditary peers
People from Itteringham
Hereditary peers elected under the House of Lords Act 1999